George L. Mikan III (G. Mike Mikan) (born April 9, 1971), is the founder, chairman and CEO of SHOT-ROCK CAPITAL. He is currently serving as CEO of Bright Health Group, Inc. He served as the President of ESL Investments, Inc. Mr. Mikan was the Interim Chief Executive Officer of Best Buy Co. Inc. from April to September 2012 and the Director from April 2008 to December 2012. He was a high-ranking executive over a 14-year period at UnitedHealth Group.

See also
His father, Larry Mikan, was a basketball player for the University of Minnesota. Larry's father (George's grandfather, whom George is named after) was NBA Hall of Famer and one of the league's first true superstars, "Mr. Basketball" George Mikan.

References

1971 births
Living people
Best Buy people
21st-century American businesspeople